P. elegans may refer to any of the following species:
 Phaps elegans, the brush bronzewing, a bird
 Phlebolepis elegans, a prehistoric jawless fish
 Piperia elegans, the elegant piperia, coast piperia, hillside rein orchid or hillside bogorchid, an orchid native to western North America
 Plagiorchis elegans, a parasitic trematode (fluke) 
 Platycercus elegans, the crimson rosella, a parrot native to eastern and south eastern Australia which has been introduced to New Zealand and Norfolk Island
 Platycraniellus elegans, an extinct species of non-mammalian synapsids
 Platypodium elegans, the graceful platypodium, a large tree found in the Neotropics
 Plestiodon elegans, the five-striped blue-tailed skink or Shanghai skink, a lizard found in East Asia
 Poiretia elegans, a flowering plant in the legume family (Fabaceae) found in Brazil
 Polyscias elegans, the celery wood, a rainforest tree found in eastern Australia
 Pomatias elegans, the round-mouthed snail, a small land snail
 Prioniodus elegans, a conodont
 Protaetia elegans, a flower chafer found in Taiwan
 Psychopyge elegans, a trilobite
 Ptychosperma elegans, the Alexander palm, solitaire palm, cabbage palm or elegant palm, a palm endemic to Australia
 Parasagitta elegans, an arrow worm

Synonyms 
 Pagurus elegans, a synonym of Calcinus elegans, a hermit crab
 Palaeocasuarius elegans, a synonym for Megalapteryx didinus, the Upland moa, an extinct bird endemic to New Zealand
 Paramecolabus elegans, a synonym of Catalabus elegans, a beetle found in India
 Periclimenes elegans, a synonym of Cuapetes elegans, a shrimp
 Phyracaces elegans, a synonym for Cerapachys elegans, an ant found in Australia
 Pleroma elegans, a synonym of Tibouchina elegans, an ornamental plant native to Brazil
 Pleurothallis elegans, a synonym for Stelis roseopunctata, an orchid
 Pococera elegans, a synonym of Cacozelia elegans, a snout moth found in Venezuela
 Pterodactylus elegans, a synonym of Ctenochasma elegans, a pterosaur